San Angelo Standard-Times is a daily newspaper based in San Angelo, Texas, United States that was established in 1884. It is owned by Gannett.

History
The newspaper was established in 1884 by J. G. Murphy, the city's second mayor.  Mr. Murphy sold the paper in the 1920s to Houston Harte.  In 1924, it became one of the two original flagships of the Harte-Hanks newspaper chain.

The San Angelo Standard-Times building was constructed in 1951, providing 38,000 square feet on two floors.  In 1984, a rehabilitation project added another 10,000 square feet.

Scripps began operating the newspaper in 1997 after purchasing it from Harte-Hanks, and as of 2015, Scripps operates this newspaper through its subsidiary Journal Media Group.  The newspaper and its reporters have won various journalism awards, including awards from the Associated Press of Texas, presented in 2015.

Alumni
The Western novelist Elmer Kelton began his career in 1948 as the farm-and-ranch editor at the Standard-Times.

References

External links

Gannett publications
San Angelo, Texas
Mass media in San Angelo, Texas
Daily newspapers published in Texas
Publications established in 1884
1884 establishments in Texas